Sámano is a surname. Notable persons with this name include:
Érick Sámano (born 1991), Mexican footballer
Eva Sámano (1910–1984), Mexican educator and first lady of Mexico
Juan José de Sámano y Uribarri (1753–1821), Spanish soldier
Miguel Sámano Peralta (born 1966), Mexican politician
Jeanette Sámano, actress
Lupe Sámano, patient on My 600-lb Life
Samano, a city in Cantabria, Spain